The 2007 Montreal Alouettes finished third place in the East Division in 2007. Jim Popp decided to remain as head coach rather than hire a replacement for Don Matthews, who unexpectedly resigned the previous season. The results were unexpected as the Alouettes endured their first losing season since rejoining the league in 1996. They appeared in the East Semi-Final, losing to the Winnipeg Blue Bombers and putting an end to a disappointing season.

Offseason

CFL draft

Preseason

 Games played with white uniforms.

Regular season

Season Standings

Season Schedule

 Games played with colour uniforms.
 Games played with white uniforms.
 Games played with alternate uniforms.

Roster

Playoffs

Schedule

 Games played with white uniforms.

East Semi-Final
Date and time: Saturday, November 11, 1:00 PM Eastern Standard TimeVenue: Canad Inns Stadium, Winnipeg, Manitoba

Awards

2007 CFL All-Star Selections
 OG – Scott Flory, 2007 CFL All-Star
 P – Damon Duval, 2007 CFL All-Star

2007 CFL Eastern All-Star Selections
 WR – Ben Cahoon, 2007 CFL Eastern All-Star
 OG – Scott Flory, 2007 CFL Eastern All-Star
 P – Damon Duval, 2007 CFL Eastern All-Star
 DB – Randee Drew, 2007 CFL Eastern All-Star

2007 Intergold CFLPA All-Star Selections
 OG – Scott Flory, 2007 Intergold CFLPA All-Star
 P – Damon Duval, 2007Intergold CFLPA All-Star

References

Montreal Alouettes
Montreal Alouettes seasons